The brighteye cusk-eel (Ophidion iris) or rainbow cusk eel, is a fish species in the family Ophidiidae. Widespread in the Gulf of California and adjacent offshores along the coast of Mexico to Banderas Bay.

References

rainbow cusk eel
Fish of the Gulf of California
rainbow cusk eel